Sciota Brook (also known as Scotch Run) is a tributary of North Branch Mehoopany Creek in Bradford County, Sullivan County, and Wyoming County, in Pennsylvania, in the United States. The stream itself is a moderate-gradient stream in an area consisting primarily of agricultural land and woodlots.

Course
Sciota Brook begins in an unnamed pond in Wilmot Township, Bradford County. It flows south-southeast for several tenths of a mile in a valley between Round Top and Tyler Mountain, entering Colley Township, Sullivan County. The stream then receives an unnamed tributary from the right and continues flowing south and south-southeast. It eventually reaches the end of the valley and crosses Pennsylvania Route 87 before turning east. A few tenths of a mile further downstream, it crosses into North Branch Township, Wyoming County and just over the border, reaches its confluence with North Branch Mehoopany Creek.

Hydrology
Sciota Brook is not designated as an impaired waterbody. In an August 2001 study, it was noted to have a low stream flow.

Geography and geology

The primary hills in the stream's vicinity are Tyler Mountain and Round Top. Despite its length of only , it flows through three counties.

Watershed and biology
The stream is entirely within the United States Geological Survey quadrangle of Jenningsville. It joins North Branch Mehoopany Creek near Lovelton.

The land use in the watershed of Sciota Brook is mainly agricultural land and woodlots. In its lower , a total of 39 percent of the stream's length is within  of a road, while 100 percent is within  of one. In 2000, the population density of the stream's watershed was 4 people per square kilometer (10 per square mile).

Sciota Brook is classified as a Coldwater Fishery.

History
Sciota Brook was entered into the Geographic Names Information System on August 2, 1979. Its identifier in the Geographic Names Information System is 1187147. The stream is also known as Scotch Run. This variant name appears on some county highway maps published by the Pennsylvania Department of Transportation.

In 2012, Chesapeake Appalachia was issued a permit to build, operate, and maintain two  water pipelines and temporary mat bridges impacting one or more unnamed tributaries of Sciota Brook.

See also
Catlin Brook, next tributary of North Branch Mehoopany Creek going downstream
Barnes Brook, next tributary of North Branch Mehoopany Creek going upstream
List of rivers of Pennsylvania

References

Tributaries of North Branch Mehoopany Creek